Natanael is a given name. Notable people with the name include:

Natanael Beskow (1865-1953), Swedish theologian
Natanael Berg (1879-1957), Swedish composer
Natanael Gärde (1880–1968), Swedish judge and politician
Natanael de Sousa Santos Júnior (born 1985), known as Júnior Santos, Brazilian football striker
Natanael (footballer, born 1990), full name Natanael Batista Pimenta, Brazilian football leftback
Natanael (footballer, born 2002), full name Natanael Moreira Milouski, Brazilian football defender